Georg Christoph Wagenseil (29 January 1715 – 1 March 1777) was an Austrian composer.

He was born in Vienna, and became a favorite pupil of the Vienna court's 
Kapellmeister, Johann Joseph Fux. Wagenseil himself composed for the 
court from 1739 to his death. He also held positions as harpsichordist and 
organist. His pupils included Johann Baptist Schenk (who was to teach 
Ludwig van Beethoven), and Marie Antoinette. He traveled little, and died in Vienna having spent most of his life there.

Wagenseil was a well-known musical figure in his day — both Joseph Haydn and Wolfgang Amadeus Mozart are known to have been familiar with his works. His early works are Baroque, while his later pieces are in the Classical style. He composed a number of operas, choral works, symphonies, concertos, 
chamber music and keyboard pieces.

Compositions
Operas
La generosità trionfante (1745) 
Ariodante (1745) 
La clemenza di Tito (1745) 
Demetrio (1746) 
Alexander der Grosse in Indien (1748)  
Il Siroe (1748) 
L'olimpiade (1749) 
Andromeda (1750) 
Antigono (1750)  
Euridice (1750) 
Armida placata (1750) 
Vincislao (1750) 
Le cacciatrici amanti (1755) 
Prometeo assoluto (1762) 
Catone (?) 
Merope (1766)

Concertos
Concerto for alto trombone in E-flat major
Concerto for cello & orchestra in A major, WV 348
Concerto for cello & orchestra in C major, WV 341
Concerto for flute, strings & continuo in D major, WWV 342
Concerto for flute, strings & continuo in G major
Concerto for fortepiano, violin & strings in A major, WWV 325
Concerto for harpsichord/organ & strings No. 1 in C major	
Concerto for harpsichord/organ & strings No. 2 in A major	
Concerto for harpsichord/organ & strings No. 4 in E-flat major	
Concerto for harpsichord/organ & strings No. 5 in B-flat major	
Concerto for harpsichord/organ & strings No. 6 in B-flat major
Concerto for oboe, bassoon, winds, strings & continuo in E-flat major, WWV 345	
Concerto for trombone & orchestra in E-flat major
Concerto for harp & orchestra in G major
Concertor for harp & strings in F major, WWV 281

Symphonic Works
Sinfonia in G minor
Symphonia in C major
Symphony in A major, WV 421
Symphony in A major, WV 432
Symphony in B-flat major, WV 441
Symphony in C major, WV 351
Symphony in C major, WV 361
Symphony in D
Symphony in D (WV 374, D10), Op. 3/1	
Symphony in E major
Symphony in E major, WV 393
Symphony in F major, WV 398
Symphony in G major, WV 413
Symphony in B-flat major, WV 438

Chamber Works
Sonata for 3 cellos & double bass (or 2 violas, cello & double bass) No.4 in A major
Sonata for 3 cellos & double bass (or 2 violas, cello & double bass) No.6 in G major
Sonata for 3 cellos & double bass (or 2 violas, cello & double bass) No.3 in C major ("Suite des pièces")
Sonata for 3 cellos & double bass (or 2 violas, cello & double bass) No.1 in D major
Sonata for 3 cellos & double bass (or 2 violas, cello & double bass) No.2 in F major
Sonata for 3 cellos & double bass (or 2 violas, cello & double bass) No.5 in B major
Suite de pièces, for 2 clarinets, 2 horns, 2 bassoons & piano in E-flat major
Flute Sonata in E minor

Keyboard Works
Divertimento for keyboard in F major( from 6 Divertimenti, Op 3)
Suite for organ in C major

Vocal Works
Confitebor, for trombone and voice

References

External links
HOASM
  
Sonatas Op. 2 – Score from Sibley Music Library Digital Scores Collection

1715 births
1777 deaths
Austrian Classical-period composers
Austrian opera composers
Male opera composers
18th-century Austrian people
Pupils of Johann Joseph Fux
18th-century classical composers
18th-century Austrian male musicians
Austrian male classical composers
18th-century Austrian musicians
Von Möller Family